The 2022 Southern Miss Golden Eagles baseball team represented the University of Southern Mississippi in the sport of baseball for the 2021 college baseball season. The Golden Eagles competed in Division I of the National Collegiate Athletic Association (NCAA) and in Conference USA. They played their home games at Pete Taylor Park in Hattiesburg, Mississippi. The team was coached by Scott Berry, who was in his thirteenth season with the Golden Eagles. This was Southern Miss' last season to compete as a member of the C-USA as they moved on to the Sun Belt Conference following the conclusion of the season.

Preseason

C-USA media poll
The Conference USA preseason poll was released on February 16, 2022 with the Golden Eagles predicted to finish in first place in the conference.

Preseason All-CUSA team
Danny Lynch – Infielder
Gabe Montenegro – Outfielder
Charlie Fischer – Designated Hitter
Ben Ethridge – Pitcher

Personnel

Schedule and results

Schedule Source:
*Rankings are based on the team's current ranking in the D1Baseball poll.

Hattiesburg Regional

Hattiesburg Super Regional

Postseason

Rankings

References

External links
•	Southern Miss Baseball

Southern Miss
Southern Miss Golden Eagles baseball seasons
Southern Miss Golden Eagles
Southern Miss